Ofra Farhi is an Israeli ambassador who has been Ambassador to Zimbabwe (presented her credentials October 2021) and is concurrently ambassador Zambia, Namibia,  and Botswana. Farhi does not reside in any of those countries but is a roving ambassador residing in Israel.

In February 2023, while crossing the street in Lusaka, Zambia, people pulled up alongside her and stole her bag which contained her diplomatic passport and cellphone.  Bodyguards were unable to prevent the theft.

References

Israeli women ambassadors
Ambassadors of Israel to Zimbabwe
Ambassadors of Israel to Zambia
Ambassadors to Botswana
Ambassadors to Namibia
Year of birth missing (living people)
Living people